The Cine Musicians Association (CMA) is an association of Indian musicians based in Mumbai. It has strength of some 1000 members, many of whom work in the film industry. Many of its members are music teachers who impart the knowledge of music to aspiring musicians. It was founded in 1952.

References

Music industry associations
Music organisations based in India
Film industry in Mumbai